Yun Me Me Lwin (born 10 July 1997) is a Burmese footballer who plays as a forward. She has been a member of the Myanmar women's national team.

International career
Yun Me Me Lwin capped for Myanmar at senior level during the 2020 AFC Women's Olympic Qualifying Tournament (first round). She was an unused player at the 2014 AFC Women's Asian Cup.

References

1997 births
Living people
Women's association football forwards
Burmese women's footballers
People from Shan State
Myanmar women's international footballers